The Cary News was published twice weekly and freely distributed by the News and Observer free to residents of Cary, North Carolina and Morrisville, North Carolina.

In 2011, The Cary News won 4 awards from the North Carolina Press Association in the large community newspaper category for news reporting, sports columns, appearance and design, and photography.  In 2009, the paper won for sports columns, features, and coverage as well as an award for multimedia. In 2008 the paper won awards from the NCPA for multimedia project, sports columns, sports coverage, and the website.

In June 2017, The Cary News and the other nine community newspapers owned by the News and Observer were refocused on food, dining, and general area news rather than community-specific reporting. As of January 2018, the community newspapers were no longer being published.

See also
 List of newspapers in North Carolina
 List of defunct newspapers of North Carolina
 The News & Observer
 The Chapel Hill News
 The Durham News
 Eastern Wake News
 North Raleigh News

References

Newspapers published in North Carolina